Petra Kvitová was the defending champion, but she chose not to participate this year.

Angelique Kerber won her maiden WTA singles title, defeating Marion Bartoli in the final 7–6(7–3), 5–7, 6–3.

Seeds

Draw

Finals

Top half

Bottom half

Qualifying

Seeds

Qualifiers

Lucky losers
  Alberta Brianti
  Varvara Lepchenko
  Jill Craybas

Draw

First qualifier

Second qualifier

Third qualifier

Fourth qualifier

References
 Main Draw
 Qualifying Draw

Open GDF Suez - Singles
Singles 2012